Menlo Park is an unincorporated community located within Edison Township in Middlesex County, New Jersey, United States.

In 1876, Thomas Edison set up his home and research laboratory in Menlo Park, which at the time was the site of an unsuccessful real estate development named after the town of Menlo Park, California. While there, he earned the nickname "the Wizard of Menlo Park". The Menlo Park lab was significant in that it was one of the first laboratories to pursue practical, commercial applications of research. It was in his Menlo Park laboratory that Thomas Edison invented the phonograph and developed a commercially viable incandescent light bulb filament. Christie Street in Menlo Park was one of the first streets in the world to use electric lights for illumination.  Edison left Menlo Park and moved his home and laboratory to West Orange, New Jersey in 1887. After his death, the Thomas Alva Edison Memorial Tower and Museum was constructed near his old Menlo Park lab and dedicated in 1938. Edison's old lab site and memorial now make up Edison State Park.  The municipality in which Menlo Park is located, which was called "Raritan Township" while he was alive, was officially changed to Edison Township on November 10, 1954, in honor of the inventor.

See also
List of neighborhoods in Edison, New Jersey

References

Neighborhoods in Edison, New Jersey
Unincorporated communities in Middlesex County, New Jersey
Unincorporated communities in New Jersey
Company towns in New Jersey